François Chesnais (22 January 1934 – 29 October 2022) was a French economist and scholar.

Life and career
Chesnais was born in Montreal on 22 January 1934. He was a member of the Scientific Council of ATTAC-France, the author of several books and numerous articles on economics and a founder of the Marxist journal Carré Rouge.

Chesnais was a member of the New Anticapitalist Party. He died at a hospital in Paris on 29 October 2022, at the age of 88.

Books
 Marx's Crisis Theory Today in Christopher Freeman ed. Design, Innovation and Long Cycles in Economic Development 2nd ed. Frances Pinter, London, 1984 
  The globalization of capital, Paris: Syros Editions, 1994 (first edition) and 1997 (revised edition)
 Actualiser l’économie de Marx, Actuel Marx Confrontation, Presses Universitaires de France, Paris, 1995
 La mondialisation financière : genèse, coûts et enjeux (directeur de publication et deux chapitres), Syros, Collection Alternatives économiques, Paris, 1996, 
 Tobin or not Tobin : une taxe internationale sur le capital (L'Esprit frappeur, 1999)
 Mondialisation : le capital rentier aux commandes in Les Temps Modernes, n°607, janvier-février 2000.
 Que se vayan todos ! Le peuple argentin se soulève avec  Jean-Philippe Divès, Éditions Nautilus, Paris, 2002. 
 Mondialisation et impérialisme  Odile Castel, François Chesnais, Gérard Dumesnil...[et al.] Paris Éd. Syllepse, 2003
 La finance mondialisée : racines sociales et politiques, configuration, conséquences -  Sous la direction de François Chesnais, La Découverte, 2004
 Les dettes illégitimes - Quand les banques font main basse sur les politiques publiques. Paris, Éd. Raisons d'Agir, juin 2011. 
 Finance Capital Today: Corporations and Banks in the Lasting Global Slump. Brill, Leiden & Boston, 2016; Haymarket Books, Chicago, IL, 2017

References

External links

1934 births
2022 deaths
Internationalist Communist Organisation politicians
New Anticapitalist Party politicians
French Trotskyists
French economists
French male writers